The  is a breed of long-tailed true bantam, originating on Shikoku Island, Kōchi Prefecture, Japan, during the Edo period. Its name means "tail drag" or "small dragging". They were not introduced to the United Kingdom until 1990. They are closely related to (and possibly derived from) the Japanese bantam and Onagadori.

References

Chicken breeds originating in Japan
Bantam chicken breeds
Chicken breeds